This is a list of members of the European Parliament for the Slovakia in the 2014 to 2019 session, ordered by name.

See 2014 European Parliament election in Slovakia for further information on these elections in Slovakia.

List 
This table can be sorted by name, party or party group: click the symbol at the top of the appropriate column.

References

2014
List
Slovakia